Il Riformista (English: "The Reformist") is an Italian political and financial newspaper based in Rome, Italy.

History and profile
Launched on 23 October 2002, Il Riformista was formed of about four pages with Orange as main colour used.

The paper closed on 30 March 2012 because of financial problems. It was later relaunched on 29 October 2019.

Columnist and journalists

Past columnists
 Tariq Ramadan
 Guia Soncini
 Ritanna Armeni
 Giampaolo Pansa
 Andrea Romano
 Marco Ferrante
 Peppino Caldarola
 Maurizio Costanzo
 Filippo Facci
 Giuliano Da Empoli
 Lucetta Scaraffia
 Claudia Mancina
 Luciano Violante
 Alberto Mingardi
 Antonello Piroso
 Chicco Testa

Current columnists 
 Maria Elena Boschi
 Fausto Bertinotti
 Biagio de Giovanni
 Giovanni Minoli
 Elsa Fornero
 Paolo Guzzanti
 Fabrizio Cicchitto

References

External links
 Il Riformista Official Site 
 

2002 establishments in Italy
2012 establishments in Italy
Newspapers established in 2002
Publications disestablished in 2012
Italian-language newspapers
Newspapers published in Rome
Socialist newspapers
Defunct newspapers published in Italy
Daily newspapers published in Italy